Dimitar Iliev (Bulgarian: Димитър Илиев; born 27 July 1986) is a Bulgarian professional footballer who plays as a midfielder.

Career
In June 2018, Iliev signed with Montana.

Honours
Pelister
Macedonian Cup: 2016–17

References

External links
 

1986 births
Living people
People from Kyustendil
Bulgarian footballers
FC Montana players
OFC Pirin Blagoevgrad players
PFC Marek Dupnitsa players
Acharnaikos F.C. players
FC Septemvri Simitli players
FK Pelister players
FC Hebar Pazardzhik players
First Professional Football League (Bulgaria) players
Second Professional Football League (Bulgaria) players
Football League (Greece) players
Macedonian First Football League players
Bulgarian expatriate footballers
Bulgarian expatriate sportspeople in Greece
Expatriate footballers in Greece
Expatriate footballers in North Macedonia
Association football central defenders
Sportspeople from Kyustendil Province